Ezza Agha Malak (born 14 July 1942) is a Lebanese-born French novelist, poet, critic and essayist.

Biography
Born in 1942 in Tripoli, Agha Malak attended the École de Lettres in Beirut. She left Lebanon for France with her two daughters in 1975 at the beginning of the Lebanese Civil War. She studied French language and literature at Lumière University Lyon 2 where she received doctorates in literature and linguistics.

Agha Malak has written novels, short stories and several collections of poetry. Her works stand out against the injustice and violence of war and criticize the role of women in the Muslim world while examining the sociological aspects of the male-female partnership. She is present at several book fairs each year, especially the annual French-language book fair in Beirut. She is still an active writer, spending her time between the north of Lebanon and Burgundy where she lives.

Awards
In 2012, Ezza Agha Malak was honoured as an officier of the French Ordre des Arts et des Lettres.

Works

Novels and short stories
2010: Qu'as-tu fait de tes mômes, Papa ? Paris, AlfAbarre
2009: Mariée à Paris... Répudiée à Beyrouth, Paris, L'Harmattan
2006: Bagdad : des morts qui sonnent plus fort que d'autres, Paris, Éditions des Écrivains
2005: Anosmia ou Nostalgie d’un sens interdit, Paris, Éditions des Écrivains, translated into English by Cynthia Hahn
2002: Récits Roses (two short stories), Paris, Éditions des Écrivains
2001: La Femme de mon mari, Paris, Éditions des Écrivains
1999: Les Portes de la Nuit, Paris, Éditions des Écrivains
1997: La Dernière des Croisés, Beirut, Maison Internationale du Livre
1996: La Mallette, Beirut, Éditions Jarrous
1994: Balafres
1992: Récits bleus (three short stories), Paris, Éditions Al-Moutanabbi
1960: Sans rendez-vous préalable (short story), Beirut, Presses de Beyrouth
1957: Le drame n’arrivera pas deux fois (short story), Beirut, Presses de Beyrouth

Poetry
2011: Mes Villes Mes Amours Mes Solitudes, Éditions Dergham Beyrouth
2008: À quatre mains et à deux cœurs, Paris, Éditions des Écrivains
2005: Petits poèmes pour un Grand Homme, Beirut, Éditions du Roy
2004: Poésie tripolitaine francophone, Tripoli, Éditions du Roy
2003: La mise à nu, Paris, Éditions des Écrivains
2000: Modes inconditionnels des aubes mensongères Paris, Éditions des Écrivains
1992: Quand les larmes seront pleurées ... , Beeirut, Technopress
1992: Entre deux battements de temps, Beirut, Technopress
1985: Migration, Beirut, Éditions Jarrous

References

1942 births
Living people
Lebanese novelists
Lebanese women writers
People from Tripoli, Lebanon
Lebanese women short story writers
Lebanese short story writers
Lebanese emigrants to France
Officiers of the Ordre des Arts et des Lettres
20th-century French poets
21st-century French poets
French women poets
20th-century short story writers
21st-century short story writers
20th-century French women writers
21st-century French women writers